Yoon Hyun-sang (born January 14, 1994) is a South Korean singer and songwriter. He is known for the TOP7 of SBS's K-pop Star Season 1. He released his debut album, Pianoforte and collaboration with labelmate IU for his debut song, "When Would It Be" on October 31, 2014.

Discography

Singles

Mini-albums
2014: PIANOFORTE (피아노포르테)
2015: 파랑:WAVE
2017: attitude
2019: LOVER

OSTs

Filmography

TV series

Variety show

References

External links
 

1994 births
Living people
K-pop singers
South Korean rhythm and blues singers
Kakao M artists
K-pop Star participants
21st-century South Korean  male singers
South Korean male singer-songwriters